Puerto Pirihueico or Pirehueico is a Chilean village (Spanish: aldea) in Panguipulli commune, of Los Ríos Region. Puerto Pirehueico lies along the 203-CH route to Huahum Pass into Argentina at eastern edge of Pirihueico Lake and is a terminal station of the ferry that crosses the lake connecting to Puerto Fuy. 

Geologically Puerto Pirihueico is placed on top of Holocene sediments on the Reigolil-Pirihueico Fault.

Populated places in Valdivia Province
Populated lakeshore places in Chile